USS Meadowlark (AMS/MSC-196) was a  acquired by the United States Navy for clearing coastal minefields.

Construction
Meadowlark was laid down on 18 May 1953, as AMS-196,  by Broward Marine, Inc., Fort Lauderdale, Florida; launched on 28 August 1954, sponsored by Mrs. Thomas E. Sheridan; reclassified  MSC-196  on 7 February 1955; and commissioned on 10 May 1955.

East Coast operations 
Meadowlark conducted shakedown training out of Charleston, South Carolina. This remained her home port into 1969, except for a period commencing February 1956, when assigned to the Naval Mine Warfare School, Yorktown, Virginia. She conducted operations from Nova Scotia to the Panama Canal Zone, and in January 1967, visited Curaçao, Netherlands West Indies. With Mine Squadron 42 she twice participated in joint exercises with the Royal Canadian Navy the first time off Nova Scotia in July 1958, and again in June 1963, along the Florida coast.

Military awards and honors 
An eager competitor in fleet exercises and battle problems, Meadowlark was recognized for her operational readiness. From 1962, she won five consecutive Battle Efficiency "E" Awards and accumulated an equal number of awards for excellence in mine counter measures.

Decommissioning 
Meadowlark was transferred to Indonesia in 1971, and renamed Pulau Alau (M-717); struck from the Naval Vessel Register on 1 May 1976; and, sold, 1 September 1976. Fate: unknown.

Notes 

Citations

Bibliography 

Online resources

External links 
 

 

Adjutant-class minesweepers
Bluebird-class minesweepers
Ships built in Fort Lauderdale, Florida
1954 ships
Cold War minesweepers of the United States
Pulau Alau
Ships transferred from the United States Navy to the Indonesian Navy